The 2006 MTV Video Music Brazil was hosted by Cazé Peçanha, Marcos Mion and Daniela Cicarelli and took place at the Credicard Hall. It was the last year where VMB focused on awarding music videos (like the MTV Video Music Awards); from 2007 on, VMB's categories were redefined to focus on the artists (like the MTV Europe Music Awards).

Nominations
winners are in bold text.

Video of the Year
B5 — "Algum Lugar"
Barão Vermelho — "Codinome Beija-Flor"
Cachorro Grande — "Sinceramente"
Charlie Brown Jr. — "Ela Vai Voltar (Todos os Defeitos de uma Mulher Perfeita)"
CPM22 — "Apostas e Certezas"
Dead Fish — "Obrigação"
Detonautas Roque Clube — "Não Reclame Mais"
Felipe Dylon — "Em Outra Direção"
Forfun — "História de Verão"
Fresno — "Quebre as Correntes"
Hateen — "1997"
Jay Vaquer — "A Falta que a Falta Faz"
Jota Quest — "O Sol"
KLB (featuring Luo) — "Obsessão"
Marcelo D2 (featuring MC Catra) — "Gueto"
Massacration — "Metal Is the Law"
NX Zero — "Apenas um Olhar"
O Rappa — "Na Frente do Reto"
Pitty — "Memórias"

Best New Artist
Cansei de Ser Sexy — "Let's Make Love and Listen to Death from Above"
Canto dos Malditos na Terra do Nunca — "Olha Minha Cara"
Forfun — "Hidropônica"
Hateen — "Quem Já Perdeu um Sonho Aqui"
NX Zero — "Além de Mim"

Best Pop Video
Jota Quest — "O Sol"
Paralamas do Sucesso — "Na Pista"
Pato Fu — "Sorte E Azar"
Sandy & Junior — "Estranho Jeito De Amar"
Skank — "Uma Canção É Pra Isso"

Best Rock Video
Charlie Brown Jr. — "Ela Vai Voltar"
CPM 22 — "Apostas E Certezas"
Nação Zumbi — "Hoje, Amanhã E Depois"
Pitty — "Déjà Vu"
Rock Rocket — "Roqueiros Também Amam"

Best Rap Video
Black Alien — "Como Eu Te Quero"
Inumanos — "Polegar Opositor"
Marcelo D2 (featuring MC Catra) — "Gueto"
MV Bill — "Preto Em Movimento"
Pavilhão 9 — "Gimme Tha Power"

Best MPB Video
Los Hermanos — "Morena"
Marisa Monte — "Bonde Do Dom"
Max de Castro — "No Balanço Das Horas"
Mombojó — "O Mais Vendido"
Negra Li — "Você Vai Estar Na Minha"

Best Independent Video
Banzé — "Doce Ilusão"
Ecos Falsos — "Réveillon"
Faichecleres — "Metida Demais"
Vanguart — "Cachaça"
Walverdes — "Seja Mais Certo"

Best Live Performance
Armandinho — "Desenho De Deus"
Barão Vermelho — "Codinome Beija-Flor"
CPM 22 — "Inevitável"
O Rappa — "Pescador De Ilusões"
Titãs — "Vossa Excelência"

Best Direction in a Video
Banzé — "Doce Ilusão" (Director: Paulinho Caruso)
Charlie Brown Jr. — "Ela Vai Voltar" (Director: Leonardo Domingues)
Marcelo D2 (featuring MC Catra) — "Gueto" (Director: Johnny Araújo)
Nasi — "Corpo Fechado" (Directors: Vitor Amati, Cássio Amarante and Oswaldo Sant’Ana)
Sepultura — "Convicted In Life" (Director: Luis Carone)

Best Art Direction in a Video
Charlie Brown Jr. — "Ela Vai Voltar"
Inumanos — "Polegar Opositor"
Marcelo D2 (featuring MC Catra) — "Gueto"
Nação Zumbi — "Hoje, Amanhã E Depois"
Sepultura — "Convicted In Life"

Best Editing in a Video
CPM 22 — "Inevitável"
F.UR.T.O. — "Flores Nas Encostas Do Cimento"
Marcelo D2 (featuring MC Catra) — "Gueto"
Rock Rocket — "Roqueiros Também Amam"
Sepultura — "Convicted In Life"

Best Cinematography in a Video
Lulu Santos — "Vale De Lágrimas"
Nasi — "Corpo Fechado"
Negra Li — "Você Vai Estar Na Minha"
Paralamas do Sucesso — "Na Pista"
Sepultura — "Convicted In Life"

Best International Video
The Black Eyed Peas — "Pump It"
Green Day — "Jesus of Suburbia"
Madonna — "Hung Up"
Nickelback — "Photograph"
Simple Plan — "Perfect"

Best Website
Charlie Brown Jr. (www.charliebrownjunior.net)
CPM 22 (www.fcocpm22.com.br)
Hateen (www.hateenfco.com.br)
Los Hermanos (www.hermaniacos.blogger.com.br)
Pitty (www.pittybr.com)

Dream Band
Vocals: Pitty
Guitar: Fabrizio Martinelli (Hateen)
Bass: Champignon (Revolucionnários)
Drums: Japinha (CPM 22)

Performances
 Charlie Brown Jr. — "Ela Vai Voltar"/"Liberdade Acima de Tudo"
 CPM 22 and NX Zero — "Além De Mim"/"Inevitável"
 Skank and Cachorro Grande — "Helter Skelter"
 Caetano Veloso — "Eu Não Me Arrependo"
 Marcelo D2 (featuring Mr. Catra) — "Gueto"
 2006 VMB Dream Band winners — "Smells Like Teen Spirit"
 Pitty and Nação Zumbi — "Deus lhe Pague"
 Living Things — "Bom Bom Bom"

MTV Video Music Brazil